The Engadine Dragons Junior Rugby League Football Club is a rugby league football club that was formed in 1958 and competes in the Cronulla-Sutherland District Rugby Football League. The club is based out of Engadine in the Sutherland Shire where its headquarters are located and usually draws on the large majority of its junior players from that suburb and neighbouring suburb, Woronora Heights.

The Engadine Dragons club currently field teams from Under 6 age groups all the way up to A Grade and is one of the most successful modern clubs in the CSDRFL/CSDJRFL producing several international players including Mat Rogers, Mark McGaw and Robbie Kearns.

Notable players

See also

External links
Official website
LeagueNet Engadine Dragons website

Rugby league teams in Sydney
Rugby clubs established in 1958
1958 establishments in Australia